Reunion is a 1982 album by The Temptations for Gordy Records. The album was released during the 1982 Temptations Reunion tour, which reunited David Ruffin and Eddie Kendricks with the Temptations after a decade-long absence. The album also features then-current Temptations Dennis Edwards, Glenn Leonard, Richard Street, and founding members Otis Williams and Melvin Franklin. Reunion featured the hit single "Standing on the Top", produced by and featuring Motown funk star Rick James, who had previously used the Temptations as the background vocalists for his 1981 hit "Super Freak". It was their first album to reach the top 40 since Wings of Love (1976).

The Reunion tour, which began in April 1982 was only partially successful. Ruffin, by then a full-blown cocaine addict, missed several shows, causing the group to be fined thousands of dollars for each performance he missed, and Eddie Kendricks' falsetto voice had weakened due to constant smoking. Group leader Otis Williams decided that the reunion would not be a permanent thing, and fired Ruffin and Kendricks shortly after Christmas 1982.

Track listing

Personnel
Performers
 Dennis Edwards - vocals (tenor)
 Melvin Franklin - vocals (bass)
 Eddie Kendricks - vocals (tenor/falsetto)
 Glenn Leonard - vocals (tenor/falsetto)
 David Ruffin - vocals (tenor/baritone)
 Richard Street - vocals (tenor)
 Otis Williams - vocals (baritone/tenor)
 Rick James - guest vocals, producer
 Mary Jane Girls - background vocals ("Standing on the Top")

Musicians
 Oscar Alston, Freddie Washington, Jervonny Collier, Nathan Watts, Eddie Watkins - bass guitar 
 Paulinho da Costa, Gary Coleman, Nathan Hughes - percussion
 Bill Elliott - electric piano, synthesizer 
 Kerry Ashby, Rudy Robinson, Erskine Williams, Clarence McDonald - keyboards 	
 Bobby Nunn, Levi Ruffin - synthesizer
 Ken Hirsch - piano
 Chris Powell - saxophone
 Ken Scott, LaMorris Payne - trumpets
 Benjamin Wright - synthesizer, arranger 		
 Ndugu Chancler, Ed Greene, Jerry Jones, Lanise Hughes, Quentin Dennard - drums
 Robert Bowles, Bruce Nazarian, Dennis Herring, Louis Russell, Wah Wah Watson, Tom McDermott - guitars

Production
Executive Producer: Berry Gordy
Tracks 3, 7 and 9 produced by Berry Gordy; track 9 co-produced by Melvin Ragin.  Recording and mix by Barney Perkins, Bob Robitalle, Bobby Brooks, Fred Law, Glen Jordan, Jane Clark, Russ Terrana.
Track 1 produced by Rick James.  Recording and mix by Rom Flye, Ann Fry and Michael Johnson.
Track 2 produced by Iris Gordy and Barrett Strong.  Recording and mix by Warren Woods.
Track 4 produced by Ron Miller. Recording and mix by Barney Perkins, Bob Robitalle, Russ Terrana, Fred Law, Kevin Sorrells, Michael Johnson.
Tracks 5, 6 and 8 produced by Smokey Robinson.  Recording and mix by Howard Wolen and Louis Russell.

Charts

Singles

References

External links 
 Reunion at Discogs
 Reunion at Rate Your Music

1982 albums
The Temptations albums
Gordy Records albums
Albums produced by Smokey Robinson
Albums produced by Berry Gordy
Albums produced by Rick James
Albums produced by Barrett Strong